The Hay Institution for Girls was located at Hay, in the Riverina district of rural NSW, Australia.

History 
It opened in February 1961, when the former Hay Gaol was re-established as a maximum security institution for girls, under the NSW Child Welfare Department. The Hay Institution for Girls was eventually closed in June 1974 due to widespread community condemnation.

Hay Institution for Girls was established by the NSW Department of Child and Social Welfare as an annex to the Parramatta Girls Home, a state-controlled child-welfare institution. The Hay Institution for Girls opened in 1961 as a place of punishment for girls who would not comply with the strict regime of the Parramatta Girls Home. It was a place of extreme discipline for girls between the ages of 14 and 18.

Disciplinary practices and routines were modelled on a similar institution for boys operating since 1945 in Tamworth, NSW. Both Hay and Tamworth institutions were originally built in 1880. Hay comprised a central cellblock containing 12 cells, called 'cabins', each containing a single iron frame bed, thin mattress and a small bench and seat attached to the wall.

The maximum number of girls held at any time was 10, overseen by 5-6 officers. Under a system outlawed in NSW in the late 19th century for adults prisoners called the 'silent system', or 'silent treatment', girls were not permitted to speak without signalling for permission; they were required to have their eyes to the floor at all times.

Movement within the site was severely restricted and always accompanied with the locking and unlocking of doors. Walking was not permitted; rather, the girls were required to march 'on the double'.

The daily routine involved hard labour (e.g. breaking concrete, digging paths and gardens, scrubbing floors and walls, sewing leather, and 'practices' that were carried out with regularity at predetermined intervals during the day).

This routine did not alter - up at 6am and return to their cells at 7pm. Hourly checks were made on the girls at night, causing sleep deprivation, and they were required to lie in their beds facing the door. No education or schooling was provided and girls who resisted, or who showed any form of attitude, were locked in isolation, placed on a restricted diet and had their sentences extended.

Typically girls sent to the Hay Institution came from poor socio-economic backgrounds. Many were indigenous children, and many had long been state wards.

The first reunion of the Girls Institution took place on the 3 and 4 of March 2007.

In 2008 the Outback Theatre for Young People produced a play titled Eyes To The Floor by Alana Valentine based on the experiences of former inmates.

See also 
Tamworth Tamworth Correctional Centre
Juvenile Justice Centres in NSW New South Wales Department of Juvenile Justice

References

External links 
Visit Hay
Parramatta Girls Home
Inquiry into Children in Institutional Care 
Exposed To Moral Danger - Hindsight program from ABC Radio National on the institution
Eyes To The Floor - Trailer

1961 establishments in Australia
Defunct prisons in New South Wales
1974 disestablishments